The Fight for Life is a 1940 American medical drama film nominated for the Best Original Score of a Picture composed by Louis Gruenberg and released by Columbia Pictures.

Plot
At the City Hospital a young intern witnesses the death of a young mother in a maternity hospital delivery room. Very worried about having overlooked a fact that could have prevented death, he began to frequent a maternity clinic in a poor neighborhood of Chicago to learn more about maternity mortality and find new ways to avoid it.

Cast
Myron McCormick (The young intern)
Storrs Haynes (The teacher)
Will Geer (2nd Teacher)
Dudley Digges (Head Doctor)
Dorothy Adams (The Young Woman)
 Effie Anderson (The Receptionist)

References

External links
 

1940 films
American black-and-white films
Films set in 1940
American drama films
1940 drama films
Columbia Pictures films
1940s English-language films
1940s American films